APIIC may refer to:

Andhra Pradesh Industrial Infrastructure Corporation, part of the Andhra Pradesh Government initiatives
APIIC Tower, Andhra Pradesh Industrial Infrastructure Corporation Tower, a supertall skyscraper planned for construction in Hyderabad, India